The Rivers State Peoples Democratic Party, also referred to as Rivers PDP, is the state chapter of the Peoples Democratic Party in Rivers State,  Nigeria. It is currently chaired by businessman and Philanthropist Felix Obuah. Prominent public figures including the late Nigerian senator Ibiapuye Martyns-Yellowe and former governor and Committee Chair on State Creation Peter Odili are products of Rivers PDP.

Party history
Since the party's foundation in the late nineties, it has remained dominant for most of the state's political history winning several governorships as well as occupying majority of seats in both the House of Assembly and the National Assembly. Marshal Harry, a Kalabari High Chief was the first member in its fold to be appointed to the Chairperson rank. In the elections of 2007, the party emerged highly successful, and maintained itself in power and in the elections of 2011, it won a total of 16 seats and held control of all state offices including the governorship.

During November 2013, the Rivers State Peoples Democratic Party saw the defection of its member Chibuike Amaechi to the opposition APC. This was followed by the departure of two senators, Magnus Abe, representing Rivers South-East; and Wilson Ake, representing Rivers West in early 2014. The drawbacks, however, did not deter the party, who went on to retain its significant political strength in the 2015 elections.

Current officeholders
At present, the party controls all 16 seats in the National Assembly.

Members of the Senate

House of Representatives

House of Assembly

Leadership
From 1999, the first chairman of the Rivers State Peoples Democratic Party was Marshal Sokari Harry, whose tenure lasted until his controversial exit three years later. He was immediately replaced by Prince Uche Secondus. In 2004, Godspower Ake took over national vice chairman (South South Zone) following the assassination of A.K. Dikibo. Ake was returned in 2008 as the state's party Chair only to be dismissed from office on 15 April 2013.
The party's current chairman is Felix Amaechi Obuah. Other regular officers are the State Vice Chairman, three Regional Vice Chairmen, Secretary, Youth Leader and Treasurer.

Chairpersons
Below is a list of past and present Chairs of the Rivers PDP:
Marshal Sokari Harry (1999–2002).
Prince Uche Secondus (2002–08).
Godspower Umejuru Ake (2008–13).
Felix Amaechi Obuah (2013–present).

References

 
Peoples Democratic Party
Organizations based in Port Harcourt
Peoples Democratic Party (Nigeria) by state